The SNCF Class Z 11500 are electric multiple units that were built by Alsthom in 1986–87. They are in service with TER Grand Est. These trains are similar to the CFL Class 2000 of the Luxembourg railways.

Alstom multiple units
Z 11500
Electric multiple units of France